Springford is a surname. Notable people with the surname include:

 Norman Springford (born 1944), Scottish businessman
 Ruth Springford (1921–2010), Canadian actress
 Vivian Springford (1913–2003), American artist

English-language surnames